Dr. Balram Bhargava is an Indian cardiologist, medical educationist, and innovator, known for his expertise and for his social commitment. Currently, serving as the Chief of Cardiothoracic Centre, AIIMS. He is Ex-Director General at the Indian Council of Medical Research, New Delhi and Secretary, Department of Health Research a division under Ministry of Health and Family Welfare, Government of India.

Under his leadership, ICMR/DHR has been able to initiate a number of Communicable disease control efforts such as Containment of Nipah and Zika outbreaks; early diagnosis of Canine Distemper Virus (Gir Forest Lions); TB Vaccine Trial and National Leprosy Vaccination Program: Based on the successful trial of MIP, an indigenous leprosy vaccine, in 6 districts of Bihar and Gujarat, Plan to launch it on a national scale to attain leprosy-free India. MERA INDIA (Malaria Elimination Research Alliance) is to develop a common platform for developing research strategies to accelerate malaria elimination efforts in India. In the area of Non-Communicable diseases his efforts have led to the Sanction of Centres for Advanced Research in NCD (10 Centres); Mission DELHI: Delhi Emergency Life Heart-Attack Initiative: a programme for early diagnosis and prehospital treatment of heart attack patients.

Biography
Balram Bhargava was born in 1961 in Lucknow. He graduated in medicine (MBBS), followed by MD and DM with specialization in Cardiology from King George’s Medical College, Lucknow. Prior to his appointment at ICMR, he was a Professor of cardiology at the All India Institute of Medical Sciences, New Delhi (AIIMS). He is a fellow of the National Academy of Sciences, India (FNASc), Fellow of the American Heart Association (FAHA), Fellow of the Academy of Medical Sciences (FAMS), Fellow of the National Academy of Medical Sciences and a Fellow of the American College of Cardiology (FACC).

Balram resides at the AIIMS residential complex at Asiad Village, New Delhi.

Social activities
Prof. (Dr.) Balram Bhargava is reported as a biomedical program administrator from AIIMS Delhi.

Prof. (Dr.) Bhargava along with Alok Ray from IIT Delhi under the leadership of then Department of Biotechnology secretary Maharaj Kishan Bhan, initiated the Indian chapter of the Stanford Biodesign and was its co-executive director (India). The organization had set goals to promote innovators of medical technology through fellowships and also to conduct internships and events related to the area. The system was supported by AIIMS, New Delhi and has Stanford University, Indian Institute of Technology, New Delhi, the Indo-US Science and Technology Forum (IUSSTF) and the Ministry of Science and Technology, Government of India as partners. Stanford India Biodesign program ended in 2013.

Since 2008, he has been working with Biodesign Fellows Srinivas Juggu, Jayant Karve and Amit Sharma on a project trying to develop a chest compression device. If this succeeds it will be useful for patients suffering sudden cardiac arrests.

Prof. (Dr.) Bhargava has spoken up about the need for better regulation in medical testing. He is one of the team of twelve doctors from India who plan to establish the Society for Less Investigative Medicine (SLIM), an initiative that hopes to combat the excessive commercial practices prevalent in India. SLIM is in the making since 2015 and the members hoped to start activities by 2016. The members of SLIM, when it is established, plan to work towards raising public awareness against the trend of unnecessary tests and excessive medical investigations.

Prof. (Dr.) Bhargava has attended many international conferences and seminars where he speaks about a cardiac stent he claims to have invented.

Publications
Some of the publications co-authored by Prof. (Dr.) Bhargava are:

 
 
  PDF Full Text

Awards and recognitions
In 2019Prof. (Dr.) Bhargava received the Gujar Mal Science Award 2018. Bhargava is a recipient of S. N. Bose Centenary Award of the Indian Science Congress, Platinum Jubilee Award of the National Academy of Sciences and the Vasvik Award. He has also received Tata Innovation Fellowship for facilitating Biodesign Innovation fellows' work. The Government of India honoured him, in 2014, by awarding him the Padma Shri, the fourth highest civilian award, for his contributions to the field of medicine (cardiology).
He is one of the laureates of the 2015 UNESCO-Equatorial Guinea International Prize for Research in the Life Sciences. In 2019, he received the Dr LEE Jong-wook Memorial Prize for Public Health.

References

1961 births
Living people
Recipients of the Padma Shri in medicine
Medical doctors from Delhi
Indian cardiologists
Indian medical academics
Indian medical writers
Fellows of the National Academy of Medical Sciences
20th-century Indian medical doctors
Fellows of the American College of Cardiology
Dr LEE Jong-wook Memorial Prize for Public Health laureates